"All or Nothing" is a song written by Steve Marriott and Ronnie Lane of the British rock band Small Faces and released as a single in 1966.

The song reached number one on the UK Singles Chart on 15 September 1966.

The song was also a major hit in both the Netherlands, where it reached number two and Ireland, where it reached number three. It was also the first song by the Small Faces to chart in the Republic of Ireland, as "Whatcha Gonna Do About It", "Sha-La-La-La-Lee" and "Hey Girl" all failed to do so.

Song information
According to Kay Marriott, Steve's mother, Steve wrote this song about his split with ex-fiancée Sue Oliver, though first wife Jenny Rylance states that Marriott told her he wrote the song for her as a result of her split with Rod Stewart. Both statements are said to be correct.

The song was recorded at IBC Studios in Portland Place, London. It appears on the Decca album From the Beginning. A live version is found on the BBC Sessions album.

Following Marriott's death in a house fire in 1991, the song was played as the requiem at his funeral.

In popular culture 
The song appeared in the soundtrack for the 2010 film Made in Dagenham. Nigel Cole's film is a dramatisation of the 1968 Ford sewing machinists strike at Ford Dagenham, where female workers protested against sexual discrimination and for equal pay.

The song is used as the theme tune (over the opening credits) on the 2012 BBC UK TV series, The Syndicate, about a group of lottery winners. Swedish pop band Tages did one of the earliest versions of the B-Side "Understanding", which appears on their 1966 album Extra Extra. The hard rock band UFO covered the song as a bonus track on their album No Heavy Petting.  The punk band X also covered the song on their 1985 album Ain't Love Grand!.

Personnel
Steve Marriott – lead and backing vocals, electric guitar
Ronnie Lane – bass guitar, backing vocals
Ian McLagan – Hammond organ, backing vocals
Kenney Jones – drums

See also
Small Faces discography

References

 Paolo Hewitt/John Hellier (2004). Steve Marriott All Too Beautiful.  Helter Skelter Publishing .

External links
The Darlings of Wapping Wharf Laundrette

1966 singles
Small Faces songs
UK Singles Chart number-one singles
Songs written by Steve Marriott
Songs written by Ronnie Lane
1966 songs
Decca Records singles
RCA Records singles